Lewistown is a census designated place and unincorporated community in Frederick County, Maryland, United States. Lewistown Elementary school, part of Frederick County Public Schools, is located in Lewistown. The town, founded in 1841, has had a school since the 19th century. There is a large elderly population in the community. It first appeared as a CDP in the 2020 Census with a population of 458.

History
The Lewistown Volunteer Fire Company was established in 1970, when the community purchased the first diesel engine in the county. Today, the fire department has six different apparatus: Engine Tanker 224, Engine 221, Tanker 22, Brush 226, Utility 22 and Ambulance 229. The fire station is staffed by volunteers from the community and two paid employees of the county.

On June 23, 1863, General John F. Reynolds' I Corps marched through Lewistown on their way to Gettysburg in pursuit of the Confederate army.

Demographics

2020 census

Note: the US Census treats Hispanic/Latino as an ethnic category. This table excludes Latinos from the racial categories and assigns them to a separate category. Hispanics/Latinos can be of any race.

References

Unincorporated communities in Frederick County, Maryland
Unincorporated communities in Maryland
Census-designated places in Frederick County, Maryland
Census-designated places in Maryland